George Fisher (1843 – 14 March 1905) was a four-time Mayor of Wellington, New Zealand from 1882 to 1885, and in 1896. He represented various Wellington electorates in Parliament for a total of 18 years. He was nicknamed ‘Tarcoola George’.

Family
Fisher was born in Dublin, Ireland on 25 December 1843, the son of James Fisher, the Government printer in Dublin, and apprenticed as a compositor in London before moving with his family to Melbourne in 1857, where his father became a co-proprietor of The Age newspaper. George arrived in New Zealand in 1863 and worked first as a printer then as a journalist on Hansard (at Parliament). He married Laura Emma Tompkins in Christchurch in 1866 and they had four sons and two daughters.

His son Francis Fisher (1877–1960) was also a Member of Parliament for Wellington between 1905 and 1915, and was Minister of Trade and Customs under Prime Minister William Massey. As a top New Zealand's tennis player, both at home and abroad, FMB Fisher reached the final of the Australian Open in 1906 - one of only four New Zealanders to play in the final of a 'Grand Slam' event. FMB Fisher's eldest daughter, Esther Fisher (1900–1991) became an international pianist.

A brother of George's, David Patrick Fisher (1850–1912), also a printer by trade and resident in Wellington 1872–1906, was a leading New Zealand union founder and organiser.

Political career

Fisher was a Wellington City Councillor from 1877 to 1881. He was elected Mayor of Wellington four times, from 1882 to 1885, and in 1896.

He represented the  Wellington South electorate from the 1884 general election until the end of the parliamentary term in 1887, and then represented 
the Wellington East electorate from the 1887 general election until the end of the parliamentary term in 1890.

The Wellington East electorate was abolished and replaced with the City of Wellington electorate, and Fisher got elected in this three-member electorate in the 1890 general election. He became a member of the Liberal Party. He was soundly defeated at the 1893 general election coming eight.

He again stood for the City of Wellington in the 1896 general election and was returned. He was also successful in the two subsequent general elections in 1899 and 1902. He died in 1905 while in office, triggering a by-election that was won by his son.

He was Minister of Education and Commissioner of Trade and Customs from October 1887 to April 1889 in Prime Minister Harry Atkinson's Scarecrow Ministry.

Brilliant but alcoholic, he "distinguished himself by being committed to an inebriates' home while still an M.P."

Further reading

Works of George Fisher

Works about George Fisher
 email: p.maxim@xtra.co.nz

References

|- 

|-

|-

1843 births
1905 deaths
New Zealand people of Irish descent
Mayors of Wellington
Members of the Cabinet of New Zealand
New Zealand Liberal Party MPs
New Zealand MPs for Wellington electorates
Members of the New Zealand House of Representatives
New Zealand education ministers
Politicians from County Dublin
Unsuccessful candidates in the 1893 New Zealand general election
19th-century New Zealand politicians
British emigrants to New Zealand